Mary Jane Kirby (born July 20, 1989) is a Canadian rugby union player. She represented  at the 2014 Women's Rugby World Cup. She was in the squad that toured New Zealand in June 2014, they played test matches against the Black Ferns and the Wallaroos.

References

1989 births
Living people
Canadian female rugby union players
Canada women's international rugby union players